PBair was an airline with its head office in the UBC II Building in Vadhana, Bangkok, Thailand. It operated scheduled domestic and international services. Its main base was Suvarnabhumi Airport. It ceased all operations in December 2009.

History 
The airline was founded in 1990 by Piya Bhirom Bhakdi, the president of the Boon Rawd Brewery, the largest in Thailand. It was originally used for flights for brewery staff only. In 1995, it received a license to offer charter flights and started operations in 1997. In February 1999, it started scheduled flights, in alliance with Thai Airways International, Bangkok Airways and Air Andaman. In November 2009 all flights were suspended until further notice. In December 2009 the owner announced that the airline was to be closed for good, and would not restart operations because of huge losses. The closure occured with the authorities on 21 December 2009.

Destinations 

PBair operated the following services:
Domestic scheduled destinations: Bangkok (initially Don Mueang, later Suvarnabhumi), Buriram, Lampang, Nakhon Phanom, Nan, Roi Et, Sakon Nakhon, Mae Sot, Mae Hong Son (2006-2007).
International scheduled destination: Da Nang, Vietnam (2007-2009).
International charter destination: Seoul, South Korea.

Fleet 
In May 2009 the PBair fleet consisted of the following aircraft:
2  ATR 72-500 leased from Bangkok Airways

Previously operated before closure 

1 Boeing 767-300
1 Dornier 328
2 Embraer ERJ 145 LR
3 Fokker F28-4000

References

External links
Official website (Defunct)

Defunct airlines of Thailand
Airlines established in 1990
Airlines disestablished in 2009
Companies based in Bangkok
2009 disestablishments in Thailand
Thai companies established in 1990